Miss Lawrence (born Lawrence Washington on October 13, 1982) is an American actor, singer and hair salon owner. Lawrence began his television career by appearing on The Real Housewives of Atlanta from 2008 to 2017.

Lawrence was born and raised in Atlanta, Georgia. Before television, he worked as a hairstylist in Atlanta boutique owner Sheree Whitfield. When Whitfield was cast on The Real Housewives of Atlanta in 2008, he was initially hired as a makeup artist for the program, but eventually became a recurring presence on the show as well. From 2013 to 2015, he hosted Bravo series, Fashion Queens.

In 2015, Lawrence appeared in the Fox prime time soap opera, Empire produced by Lee Daniels. In 2016, Daniels cast Lawrence in the series regular role of Miss Bruce in his another soap, Star. Lawrence later made his big screen debut in Lee Daniels' The United States vs. Billie Holiday, and later was cast in The Deliverance. He also appeared in the 2022 romantic comedy film, Bros.

Filmography

References

External links

1982 births
Living people
African-American actors
Actors from Atlanta
American male television actors